Ihor Bohdanovych Ilkiv (born 15 March 1985) is a professional Ukrainian football defender who plays for FC Rukh Vynnyky in the Ukrainian Second League.

Playing career
IIkiv began his career with FC Karpaty-3 Lviv of the Ukrainian Second League. He also featured with FC Karpaty-2 Lviv in the Ukrainian First League. In 2005, he signed with FC Spartak Ivano-Frankivsk. During his tenure with FC Lviv helped the club win promotion to the Ukrainian Premier League in the 2008/2009 season. He later featured in the First League with FC Obolon-Brovar Kyiv, and FC Nyva Ternopil. In 2015, he went overseas to Canada to sign with Toronto Atomic FC of the Canadian Soccer League. In 2016, he returned to Ukraine to sign with FC Rukh Vynnyky in the Second League.

References

External links
Profile on Official FC Lviv Website
Profile on EUFO
Profile on Football Squads

1985 births
Living people
Ukrainian footballers
FC Spartak Ivano-Frankivsk players
FC Lviv players
FC Obolon-Brovar Kyiv players
FC Karpaty-2 Lviv players
FC Karpaty-3 Lviv players
FC Nyva Ternopil players
Toronto Atomic FC players
FC Rukh Lviv players
Ukrainian Premier League players
Canadian Soccer League (1998–present) players
Association football defenders
Ukrainian First League players
Ukrainian Second League players
Sportspeople from Lviv